Landerneau station (French: Gare de Landerneau) is a French railway station serving the town Landerneau, Finistère department, in western France. It is situated on the Paris–Brest railway and the branch to Quimper.

Services

The station is served by high speed trains to Brest, Rennes and Paris, and regional trains to Brest, Morlaix, Quimper and Rennes.

References

Railway stations in Finistère
TER Bretagne